The Howrah was an iron hulled sailing ship of 1,098 tons, built at Sunderland in 1864 by Pile, Spence and Company. She arrived in Fiji on 26 June 1884 carrying 575 passengers.

The Howrah was chartered for three voyages from England to New Zealand. During one of these voyages, although she made the passage in 96 days, she encountered some very rough weather and ten passengers died.

The Howrah was also used to carry indentured labourers to the West Indies. She arrived in British Guiana on 13 Feb 1869, Trinidad on  3 March 1873 carrying 449 (13 died during the trip)  and Suriname on 8 April 1874 carrying  Indian indentured labourers.

See also 
 Indian indenture ships to Fiji
 Indian indenture system

External links 
 A tapestry of the Howrah
 Howrah

References 

History of Guyana
Indian indenture ships to Fiji
Victorian-era passenger ships of the United Kingdom
Individual sailing vessels
1864 ships